The Great Hall of the People, also translated as the Chongqing People's Auditorium, located in central Chongqing, China, is a large hall for political meetings and cultural events. The hall is located in Yuzhong District, and serves as one of the architectural symbols of Chongqing. The exterior resembles the Temple of Heaven in Beijing.

Construction of the hall began in June 1951 and completed in April 1954, with the involvement of Deng Xiaoping, who was the first secretary of the Communist Party's Southwest Bureau at the time. The building includes a large auditorium and three adjoining parts to the east, south, and north. It covers a total area of 66,000 m2. The auditorium covers 18,500 m2. The building is 65 meters high. The circular domed auditorium is 55 meters high and its internal diameter is 46.33 meters. The auditorium is encircled by five storeys of additional viewing areas and has a seating capacity of 4,200 people. The building is symmetric, with colonnades and wings.

The building can be viewed from the People's Square below. Opposite is the Three Gorges Museum. It is currently the meeting place of the municipal legislative bodies – the Chongqing Municipal People's Congress (Renda) and People's Political Consultative Conference (Zhengxie).

See also
 Great Hall of the People, Beijing

References

External links
 }

Yuzhong District
1954 establishments in China
Buildings and structures completed in 1954
Buildings and structures in Chongqing
Politics of Chongqing
Tourist attractions in Chongqing
Government buildings in China
Theatres in Chongqing
Domes